Peeples is a 2013 American romantic comedy film written and directed by Tina Gordon Chism. It stars Craig Robinson and Kerry Washington and was released by Lionsgate on May 10, 2013. Despite being billed as a Tyler Perry film, it is the only movie that he has produced but did not write or direct.

Peeples received mixed reviews from critics and was a box office bomb, only grossing $9.3 million against a $15 million budget.

Plot
The Peeples are an affluent East Coast family celebrating their annual Moby Dick Day reunion at Sag Harbor in the Hamptons. The weekend is interrupted when Wade Walker (Robinson), the fiancé of Grace Peeples (Washington), shows up to propose after being goaded by his brother, Chris (Malcolm Barrett).

Upon arrival, Wade loses his wallet while being chased by the family dog. At the grocery store, he sees Grace's father Virgil (David Allen Grier), a judge, talking to a woman later revealed to be the mayor. He also sees Grace's sister, Gloria (Hawk), with her lover, Meg (Lewis-Davis), who is not known to the family. Wade learns more about Grace, including about her ex-boyfriends, breast implants, and mother. Grace's mother, Daphne (S. Epatha Merkerson), is a former singer and recovering alcoholic. Wade attempts to propose at dinner, asking everyone to say what they love about the people in their lives. This ends abruptly when Virgil says he had to pay for Wade at the store.

Wade goes to see Virgil play at a club but discovers he is not there. In the park near the beach, Wade encounters a group of nudists, which includes Virgil. At the guest house, Wade confronts Grace about her implants, and she is honest. They play "naughty school girl". Virgil peeks through the window and runs off in disgust.

Wade discovers that Grace's musician brother, Simon (Tyler James Williams), is also a thief. While playing through the Peeples's house, Wade finds Daphne's headpiece from her days as a performer and begins to sing while wearing it. He is caught by Virgil. Chris shows up unexpectedly to "help" Wade propose. Because of Chris's borrowed Gamma Phi sweater, Virgil thinks they are fraternity brothers and invites him to stay.

At Nana Peeples's (Diahann Carroll) house, Wade gets Daphne to sing, while Virgil watches in disgust. Chris makes advances towards Gloria, angering Meg. Back home, Daphne discovers her expensive earrings have been stolen. Virgil believes Wade is the thief. Wade and Chris are at the bar, where they see Simon talking to an uninterested woman. They follow him into the bathroom and pretend to be thugs, but then tell him to return his mother's earrings and stop stealing. Chris returns to the guest house to find Gloria, while Wade finds Virgil in a sweat tent and tries to bear it for Grace's hand in marriage. Wade ends up burning the tent down.

At the Moby Dick Day celebration, Grace tells Wade he looks terrible and offers him a drink from a thermos with a mushroom drawn on it. The mayor confronts Wade. While Virgil is giving a rendition of Captain Ahab, Wade hallucinates that Virgil is talking to him and charges at him with a harpoon. Wade is knocked unconscious.

Wade wakes up and is insulted by Virgil. Wade wants to head back to New York with Grace and Chris, but Grace wants to stay with her family. Wade and Chris leave. After the brothers depart, Virgil admits he has been swimming with the Humpback Whale non-sexually, Gloria and Meg tell everyone about their relationship, Simon admits to his stealing, and Daphne admits she put mushrooms in her drinks. The dog returns Wade's wallet, and Simon takes Wade's engagement ring out of his pocket.

Grace falls into her mother's arms, realizing Wade was telling the truth. She returns to New York a few days later, without being able to contact Wade. She sees his schedule book and meets him at a kids' museum. Grace apologizes and proposes to Wade. He proposes to her in return. Virgil arrives to accept Wade into the family, and the entire family joins Wade on stage to perform for the children.

Cast
 Craig Robinson as Wade Walker
 Kerry Washington as Grace Peeples
 David Alan Grier as Virgil Peeples
 S. Epatha Merkerson as Daphne Peeples 
 Melvin Van Peebles as Grandpa Peeples
 Diahann Carroll as Nana Peeples
 Tyler James Williams as Simon Peeples
 Kali Hawk as Gloria Peeples
 Malcolm Barrett as Chris Walker
 Ana Gasteyer as Mayor Hodge
 Kimrie Lewis-Davis as Meg

Soundtrack
The soundtrack was released May 7, 2013 by Lakeshore Records for MP3 download. It features six tracks used in the film:

 Craig Robinson – "Speak It (Don't Leak It!)" 
 Tyler James Williams - "Drawers on the Floor"
 Maxayn Lewis – "Turn You On"
 Aaron Zigman – "Sweat Lodge"
 Aaron Zigman – "Run Chickens Run"
 Craig Robinson, David Alan Grier, & Maxayn Lewis – "Speak It (Don't Leak It!) Reprise"
 Saida Karoli - "Maria Salome"

Reception

Box office
Peeples grossed $4.6 in its opening weekend, finishing at No. 4 behind Iron Man 3, The Great Gatsby and Pain & Gain. It made $9.3 million total, the lowest ever for a Tyler Perry production.

Critical response
On Rotten Tomatoes the film has an approval rating of 37% based on 62 reviews, with an average rating of 5.2/10. The site's critical consensus reads, "Peeples is a warm, amiable farce that offers a few chuckles but mostly falls back on predictable plotting and an overwrought message." On Metacritic the film has a score of 52 out of 100, based on 26 critics, indicating "mixed or average reviews". On CinemaScore, audiences gave the film an average grade of "B−" on an A+ to F scale.

Home media
Peeples was released to DVD and Blu-ray on September 10, 2013, and early on August 27 on Video/On-Demand.

See also
List of black films of the 2010s

References

External links
 
 

2013 films
2013 comedy films
2013 directorial debut films
African-American comedy films
Films scored by Aaron Zigman
Films shot in Connecticut
Lionsgate films
2010s English-language films
2010s American films
African-American films